Kalauzlija is a village in the municipality of Karbinci, North Macedonia.

Demographics
According to the 2002 census, the village had a total of 61 inhabitants. Ethnic groups in the village include:

Macedonians 13
Turks 48

References

Villages in Karbinci Municipality
Turkish communities in North Macedonia